Carle Vernet station is an intermediate stop on line C of the tramway de Bordeaux, and the southern terminus of line D. It is named after the rue Carle Vernet, which in turn is named for Bordeaux native, the 18th century painter Carle Vernet.

Location
The stations is located on rue Carle Vernet in Bordeaux, close to its junction with the main rue d'Armagnac and rue Leon Palliere.

Services
Routes run from Carle Vernet to Berges du Lac, Terres Neuves and Les Aubiers. There are also connections with buses of the TBC.

See also
 TBC
 Tramway de Bordeaux

Bordeaux tramway stops
Railway stations in France opened in 2008
Tram stops in Bordeaux